Yumen Pass (Uyghur: قاش قوۋۇق), or Jade Gate or Pass of the Jade Gate, is the name of a pass of the Great Wall located west of Dunhuang in today's Gansu Province of China. During the Han dynasty (202 BC – AD 220), this was a pass through which the Silk Road passed, and was the one road connecting Central Asia with East Asia (China), the former called the Western Regions. Just to the south was the Yangguan pass, which was also an important point on the Silk Road. These passes, along with other sites along the Silk Road, were inscribed in 2014 on the UNESCO World Heritage List as the Silk Roads: the Routes Network of Chang'an-Tianshan Corridor World Heritage Site.  The pass is at an elevation of 1400 meters.

Etymology 
Although the Chinese guan is usually translated simply as "pass", its more specific meaning is a "frontier pass" to distinguish it from an ordinary pass through the mountains. Yumen guan 玉門關 and Yang guan 陽關 are derived from: yu 玉 = 'jade' + men 門 = 'gate', 'door'; and yang 陽 = 'sunny side', 'south side of a hill', 'north side of a river,' and guan 關 = ‘frontier-passes’.

It is not to be confused with the city Yumen (玉門, literally Jade Gate) in Gansu, China. Although both are within the same Jiuquan "prefecture-level city" (a multi-county administrative unit) of Gansu province, Yumen Pass is located some 400 km to the west of its namesake city.

History 
Yumen Pass was one of the most famous passes leading to the north and west from Chinese territory. During the Early Han, "... a defensive line was established from Jiuquan ('Wine Springs') in the Gansu Corridor west to the Jade Gate Pass at its end."

Footnotes

References
 
 
 
 Yuan Julian Chen, 春風玉門，《福建文學》Fujian Literature，2014年第五期，頁72-76.
 

Great Wall of China
Mountain passes of China
Geography of Gansu
Sites along the Silk Road
Major National Historical and Cultural Sites in Gansu
Han dynasty architecture